Star East Airline S.R.L. is a charter airline based in Bucharest, Romania.

Fleet

As of September 2022, the Star East Airline fleet comprises the following aircraft:

References

External links 

 

Airlines established in 2016
Airlines of Romania
Charter airlines
Companies based in Bucharest
Romanian companies established in 2016